Welshpool Football Club is a football team, based in Welshpool, playing in the Mid Wales Football League.

The club was founded as Welshpool Football Club on 28 August 1877 following a meeting at the National Schoolroom. They play at the Maes y Dre Recreation Ground, Welshpool, playing in the Ardal Leagues North East.

History 
Welshpool Town was formed on 28 August 1877 but adopted such colourful names as Welshpool Wanderers and Welshpool Warriors – although the latter may have been a separate club.  The club reformed as Welshpool Powysland FC in September 1889 after one season as Welshpool United and briefly flirted with the Shropshire League. Following the 1889 reformation he club colours were chosen as pink and slate. 
After the First World War Welshpool competed in the Central Wales leagues winning the Central Section in 1921.  Four years later in 1925 the club stepped up to the First Division (North) after finishing as runners up to Llanidloes Town.

After the Second World War Welshpool moved to the Welsh National League (Wrexham area). Success followed including Welsh National League Champions 1955, 1956, 1962 and 1965.  The club then returned to the Mid Wales League which it won seven times between 1968 and 1980, as well as winning the Welsh Amateur Cup in 1972. The club continued to be a force in Mid Wales football throughout the 1970s and 1980s which led to their application to apply as founder members of the Cymru Alliance in 1990. They finished second in 1993 and 1996 and as champions Oswestry Town were not eligible for promotion, Welshpool took their place in the League of Wales in the 1996–97 season instead, finishing 17th.

Next season they were relegated and stayed in the Alliance until winning the competition in 2002. In the 2002–03 season they finished next to bottom, but appealed against relegation to the FAW, because Neath were denied promotion as they failed to meet Welsh Premier ground criteria. To the surprise of many, they were reinstated in the League for 2003–04.

In the 2005–06 season, the club finished 6th in the Welsh Premier League, their highest finish in the league to date.

Successive relegations

Due to the Welsh Premier League restructure, the club lost their place in the top flight after not applying for a domestic licence. Life in the Cymru Alliance got off to a disastrous start as, after picking up just 4 points from their first six games, they were deducted 15 points for fielding ineligible players.

Manager Graham Evans resigned shortly afterwards, three months into the job, citing a breakdown in relations with the Chairman. Head Coach Benji Evans took charge as caretaker Manager, before the arrival of Guilsfield boss, Mike Barton, took over the reins. However, just a month into his reign, he too quit the club. A further three points were deducted for the club failing to fulfil the fixture at Penrhyncoch. Benji Evans again took charge in a Caretaker capacity  before the club recruited Connah's Quay striker Chris Herbert moved to the club for his first job in management, as player manager. Over the remaining months of the season, Herbert and Evans completely restructured the playing squad, bringing in various quality and experienced players and results improved dramatically. Their efforts weren't good enough to prevent the club's second successive relegation, and the massive points deficit was too great, but they did get back into positive points before the end of the season. However, on the final day of the season, away at Rhyl FC, a suspended John Keegan appeared in the starting line-up and the club forfeited another three points, ending the campaign rock bottom on zero points.

Fighting Back

In the summer of 2011, the club's sponsorship agreement with Technogroup ended and the side reverted to the name of Welshpool Football Club. Due to the impact this had on the finances, the club opted to become fully amateur and manager, Chris Herbert, took up the position of Assistant Manager of Rhyl FC.

The club appointed Reserve Manager, Adam Knight, to the position of Manager following his side's success in the Montgomeryshire Amateur League Division 2. The club's existence was thrown into jeopardy when Knight resigned two weeks before the season and the club had no registered players. However, the Spar Mid Wales League agreed to postpone the club's opening three fixtures to allow time for a new manager to be appointed. Local players David Jones and Neil Breeze took control of the side and pulled together a team in time for the opening match with title favourites Montgomery Town FC.

Following Welshpool's 10–1 defeat to local rivals Waterloo Rovers on Boxing Day 2011, Sky Sports presenter Jeff Stelling made a joke at the club's expense on Soccer Saturday.  Manager David Jones then wrote to the programme explaining the club's plight and that the heavy scoreline was largely the result of him having to spend the second half as a stand-in goalkeeper.  The letter was read live on air by Stelling, and Soccer Saturday reporter and ex-professional player Chris Kamara then offered to turn out for the club to aid their fight against relegation.

Kamara made his debut on 28 January 2012, but could not prevent a 6–1 home defeat to Rhayader Town, though he did provide the corner that led to Welshpool's goal early in the second half with the score at 2–0.

Because of transfer rules, Kamara was signed to the club until the end of the 2011–12 season, and played for the team again when they hosted Newbridge-on-Wye on 28 March 2012. He was joined in that match by another former professional player and Soccer Saturday regular, Paul Merson, who also signed up to Welshpool. Merson scored in the match, but Welshpool still lost 4–1.

Manager David Jones was relieved of his duties as manager on 3 June 2013 and during the summer, Welshpool Town decided to bring back ex-Manager Russell Cadwallader, who had a successful period as manager during the late 1990s and early 2000s. David Jones was offered the role of Assistant Manager, but choose to move to local rivals Berriew as manager. In 2014–15 Welshpool finish 10th in the Mid Wales League Division 1, winning nine, drawing eight and losing 13, scoring 58 goals and conceding 75.

Honours 

Cymru Alliance – Winners (1): 2001–02
Cymru Alliance – Runners-Up (3): 1992–93; 1993–94; 1995–96
Mid Wales League - Champions (7): 1967–68; 1968–69; 1970–71; 1972–73; 1974–75; 1976–77; 1979–80
Welsh National League (Wrexham Area) – Champions (4): 1954–55; 1956–57; 1961–62; 1964–65
Welsh Amateur Cup – Winners: 1971–72
Central Wales Challenge Cup – Winners: 1970–71, 1973–74, 1976–77, 1979–80, 1989–90, 1993–94, 1998–99, 1999–2000, 2001–02
Mid Wales League Cup – Runners–up: 2017–18

Biggest victories and losses 
Biggest League of Wales win: 8–0 v Cemaes Bay in 1998.
Biggest League of Wales defeat: 0–8 at Barry Town in 1997.

External links 
 Information Site
 Official Site

References 

Sport in Powys
Football clubs in Wales
Association football clubs established in 1878
1878 establishments in Wales
Welshpool
Cymru Premier clubs
Cymru Alliance clubs
Mid Wales Football League clubs
Ardal Leagues clubs
Montgomeryshire Football League clubs